Tim Holmes may refer to:
 Tim Holmes (artist), American artist and sculptor
 Tim Holmes (actor), American actor and musician

See also
 Timothy Holmes, English surgeon
 TJ Holmes (athlete) (Timothy Lamont Holmes), American hurdler